Vassilis Koukalani is an Iranian-Greek actor.

Career
He was born in Cologne, West Germany, to an Iranian father and Greek mother in 1969. He immigrated from Tehran to Athens in 1980.

Filmography

References

External links

1969 births
Living people
Greek male film actors
German male film actors
Iranian male film actors
American Academy of Dramatic Arts alumni
Iranian people of Greek descent
Iranian emigrants to Greece
Iranian diaspora film people
Male actors from Athens
Male actors from Tehran